San Jacinto, officially the Municipality of San Jacinto,  is a 4th class municipality in the province of Masbate, Philippines. According to the 2020 census, it has a population of 29,686 people.. San Jacinto is the commercial capital of Ticao Island.

It is located on Ticao Island.

Geography

Barangays
San Jacinto is politically subdivided into 21 barangays.

Climate

Demographics

Economy

Archaeological and Ecological Landscape and Seascape of Ticao
The municipality is part of Ticao island, which is known as an archaeological landscape, possessing thousands of pre-colonial artifacts such as the Baybayin-inscribed Rizal Stone, Ticao gold spike teeth, Burial jars of varying designs and sizes, jade beads, human face rock statues, and the Ticao petrographs. Much of the homes in Ticao island use these archaeological finds to design their interiors. The island is also an ecological frontier for the conservation of manta rays. The island also possesses a 'rare subspecies' of Visayan warty pig, that is almost near extinction.

References

External links
 [ Philippine Standard Geographic Code]
Philippine Census Information
Local Governance Performance Management System

Municipalities of Masbate